Chloromethane, also called methyl chloride, Refrigerant-40, R-40 or HCC 40, is an organic compound with the chemical formula . One of the haloalkanes, it is a colorless, odorless, flammable gas. Methyl chloride is a crucial reagent in industrial chemistry, although it is rarely present in consumer products,  and was formerly utilized as a refrigerant.

Occurrence
Chloromethane is an abundant organohalogen, anthropogenic or natural, in the atmosphere.

Marine
Laboratory cultures of marine phytoplankton (Phaeodactylum tricornutum, Phaeocystis sp., Thalassiosira weissflogii, Chaetoceros calcitrans, Isochrysis sp., Porphyridium sp., Synechococcus sp., Tetraselmis sp., Prorocentrum sp., and Emiliana huxleyi) produce CH3Cl, but in relatively insignificant amounts. An extensive study of 30 species of polar macroalgae revealed the release of significant amounts of CH3Cl in only Gigartina skottsbergii and Gymnogongrus antarcticus.

Biogenesis
The salt marsh plant Batis maritima contains the enzyme methyl chloride transferase that catalyzes the synthesis of CH3Cl from S-adenosine-L-methionine and chloride. This protein has been purified and expressed in E. coli, and seems to be present in other organisms such as white rot fungi (Phellinus pomaceus), red algae (Endocladia muricata), and the ice plant (Mesembryanthemum crystallinum), each of which is a known CH3Cl producer.

Sugarcane and the emission of methyl chloride
In the sugarcane industry, the organic waste is usually burned in the power cogeneration process. When contaminated by chloride, this waste burns, releasing methyl chloride in the atmosphere.

Interstellar detections
Chloromethane has been detected in the low-mass Class 0 protostellar binary, IRAS 16293–2422, using the Atacama Large Millimeter Array (ALMA). It was also detected in the comet 67P/Churyumov–Gerasimenko (67P/C-G) using the Rosetta Orbiter Spectrometer for Ion and Neutral Analysis (ROSINA) instrument on the Rosetta spacecraft. The detections reveal that chloromethane can be formed in star-forming regions before planets or life is formed.

Production
Chloromethane was first synthesized by the French chemists Jean-Baptiste Dumas and Eugene Peligot in 1835 by boiling a mixture of methanol, sulfuric acid, and sodium chloride.  This method is the forerunner for that used today but uses hydrogen chloride instead of sulfuric acid and sodium chloride.

Chloromethane is produced commercially by treating methanol with hydrochloric acid or hydrogen chloride, according to the chemical equation:

 CH3OH + HCl  →  CH3Cl + H2O

A smaller amount of chloromethane is produced by treating a mixture of methane with chlorine at elevated temperatures.  This method, however, also produces more highly chlorinated compounds such as dichloromethane, chloroform, and carbon tetrachloride.  For this reason, methane chlorination is usually only practiced when these other products are also desired.  This chlorination method also cogenerates hydrogen chloride, which poses a disposal problem.

Dispersion in the environment 

Most of the methyl chloride present in the environment ends up being released to the atmosphere. After being released into the air, the atmospheric lifetime of this substance is about 10 months with multiple natural sinks, such as ocean, transport to the stratosphere, soil, etc.

On the other hand, when the methyl chloride emitted is released to water, it will be rapidly lost by volatilization. The half-life of this substance in terms of volatilization in the river, lagoon and lake is 2.1 h, 25 h and 18 days, respectively.

The amount of methyl chloride in the stratosphere is estimated to be 2 x 106 tonnes per year, representing 20-25% of the total amount of chlorine that is emitted to the stratosphere annually.

Uses

Large scale use of chloromethane is for the production of dimethyldichlorosilane and related organosilicon compounds. These compounds arise via the direct process. The relevant reactions are (Me = CH3):
x MeCl + Si → Me3SiCl, Me2SiCl2, MeSiCl3, Me4Si2Cl2, ...
Dimethyldichlorosilane (Me2SiCl2) is of particular value as a precursor to silicones, but trimethylsilyl chloride (Me3SiCl) and methyltrichlorosilane (MeSiCl3) are also valuable.
Smaller quantities are used as a solvent in the manufacture of butyl rubber and in petroleum refining.

Chloromethane is employed as a methylating and chlorinating agent, e.g. the production of methylcellulose. It is also used in a variety of other fields: as an extractant for greases, oils, and resins, as a propellant and blowing agent in polystyrene foam production, as a local anesthetic, as an intermediate in drug manufacturing, as a catalyst carrier in low-temperature polymerization, as a fluid for thermometric and thermostatic equipment, and as a herbicide.

Obsolete applications
Chloromethane was a widely used refrigerant, but its use has been discontinued. Chloromethane was also once used for producing lead-based gasoline additives (tetramethyllead).

Safety
Inhalation of chloromethane gas produces central nervous system effects similar to alcohol intoxication. The TLV is 50 ppm and the MAC is the same. Prolonged exposure may have mutagenic effects.

References

External links

Data sheet at inchem.org
Toxicological information
Information about chloromethane
Concise International Chemical Assessment Document 28 on chloromethane
IARC Summaries & Evaluations Vol. 71 (1999)
Ohligschläger et al. (2020). Chloromethanes. In Ullmann's Encyclopedia of Industrial Chemistry. doi:10.1002/14356007.a06_233.pub4

Greenhouse gases
Halogenated solvents
Halomethanes
Hazardous air pollutants
IARC Group 3 carcinogens
Chloroalkanes
Refrigerants
Halogen-containing natural products
Methylating agents